The term disappeared most commonly refers to the victims of forced disappearance.

Disappeared or The Disappeared may also refer to:

 Disappeared (Northern Ireland), forced disappearance during The Troubles
 Missing person, any person who has disappeared and whose status as alive or dead cannot be confirmed

Film and television
 The Disappeared (2008 film), a British horror film by Johnny Kevorkian
 The Disappeared (2012 film), a Canadian drama film by Shandi Mitchell
 Disappeared (TV program), an American program on Investigation Discovery
 "Disappeared" (Law & Order), a television episode
 "The Disappeared" (Star Wars: The Clone Wars), a two-part television episode
 "The Disappeared" (The Strain), a television episode

Literature
 The Disappeared (novel), a 2015 novel by Roger Scruton
 Disappeared, a 1995 play by Phyllis Nagy
 The Disappeared, a 2002 novel by Kristine Kathryn Rusch
 The Disappeared, a 2009 novel by Kim Echlin

Music
 Disappeared (album), a 2000 album by Spring Heel Jack

See also
 
 Desaparecidos (disambiguation)
 Disappear (disambiguation)
 Disappearance (disambiguation)
 Disappearing (disambiguation)
 Missing (disambiguation)
 Missing women (disambiguation)